Antoaneta Frenkeva (Bulgarian: Антоанета Френкева, born 24 August 1971) is a former breaststroke swimmer from Bulgaria, who won the silver medal in the 100 m breaststroke at the 1988 Summer Olympics in Seoul, South Korea, just behind her teammate Tanya Dangalakova. In the same tournament the seventeen-year-old captured the bronze in the 200 m breaststroke.

External links
 
 
 

1971 births
Living people
Bulgarian female swimmers
Bulgarian female breaststroke swimmers
Swimmers at the 1988 Summer Olympics
Olympic swimmers of Bulgaria
Olympic silver medalists for Bulgaria
Olympic bronze medalists for Bulgaria
People from Smolyan
Place of birth missing (living people)
Olympic bronze medalists in swimming
Medalists at the 1988 Summer Olympics
Olympic silver medalists in swimming
20th-century Bulgarian women